Pleasant Brook is a hamlet located south of Cherry Valley, at the corner of NY 165 and Middlefield Road in the Town of Roseboom in Otsego County, New York, United States. Pleasant Brook runs west through the hamlet.

References

Hamlets in Otsego County, New York
Hamlets in New York (state)